Sekou Diarra (born 27 July 1993) is a Malian footballer who plays as a right-back for Onze Créateurs and the Mali national team.

International career
Diarra made his professional debut with the Mali national team in a 2–2 2016 African Nations Championship tie with Uganda on 19 January 2016.

References

External links
 
 

1993 births
Living people
People from Kita, Mali
Malian footballers
Mali international footballers
Association football fullbacks
AS Onze Créateurs de Niaréla players
Malian Première Division players
21st-century Malian people
Mali A' international footballers
2016 African Nations Championship players
2020 African Nations Championship players